Zaildar was the title of the grand jagirdars (landlords) of the area, who were in charge of a Zail which was an administrative unit of group of villages during the British Indian Empire. The Settlement Officer, with the advice of the Deputy Commissioner, was responsible for appointing Zaildars from amongst the men of the tribe or the area, thus reinforcing his preexisting social authority with the official sanction as the representative of the government. Each Zail was an administrative unit, extending between 40 to 100 villages. Each village was headed by the Lambardar who was assisted by the Safedposh Zamindars (influential landlords or white collar gentry) of the village. Zaildars were the revenue-collecting officers and were also responsible for maintaining law and order. The Lambardar and Safedposh assisted the Zaildar. The Zaildar in turn assisted the Deputy Commissioner. The Zaildar was more influential than the Lambardar (village head) because a Zail included several villages.

Influence of Zaildari system
The position was important as it extended the influence of the colonial state into the villages. It also reinforced the already dominant social status of the Zaildar with official government sanction. The Zaildar exercised authority and patronage over the villagers.

Appointment criteria
Zails were established and demarcated by the District collector (also called Deputy Commissioner) during the land revenue settlement exercise. Settlement officers, with advice from the District collector and subject to the final approval of the state's Financial Commissioner, appointed a Zaildar to each Zail either on a hereditary basis, for one person's life or for a fixed tenure. The Zailars were equivalent to the Chaudharis (feudal zamindars) of earlier times and were hand-picked by the higher authorities, who based their decision on issues such as caste or tribe, local influence, extent of landholding, services rendered to the state by him or his family, and personal character and ability. A Zaildar once appointed could only be removed from office for misconduct or neglect; removal on account of old age or disability was a harsh punishment and in such cases he could continue to operate through a representative.

Role and remuneration of Zaildars
Zaildars were essentially revenue ministers and representatives of the British Empire who received remuneration for their duties, life grants of either a fixed amount or a grant equal to one per cent of the revenue of their zails from the assessment of any single village that they chose. Some of the responsibilities of the Zaildar corresponded to the responsibilities that fell under the Deputy Commissioner, such as revenue collection, mutations, local governance issues, related dispute resolution, etc. Other duties corresponded with the responsibilities that fell under the Settlement officer, such as revenue settlement, reassessments, preparation of maps, etc.

Safedposh
In addition to these life , or grants, there were some Safedposhi grants of a semi-hereditary nature enjoyed by some of the leading agricultural families. They were semi-hereditary because one of the conditions of the grant was that on the death of an incumbent, his successor should, if possible, be a member of the same family.

Abolishment
Post the Indian independence in 1947, the system of Zails, Zaildars and Safedposh continued to exist till 1962. Then the system was abolished by CM of Punjab Partap Singh Kairon following demands from his ministers and Members of the Legislative Assemblys, because of conflicts between the elected MLAs and the Zaildars. Police and Tehsil officers had been giving more weight to the opinions of Zailars and this had undermined the MLAs.

In popular media
 Kapur Singh Ghuman wrote a book called Zaildar in 1972.
 Punjabi movies with Zialdar in the title include Zaildar (1972), Nikka Zaildar (2016) and Nikka Zaildar 2 (2017).

See also

 List of Zaildars by Zail
 Indian feudalism
 Indian honorifics
 Maratha titles
 Jagirdar
 Mankari
 Lambardar
 Patwari
 Sarpanch
 Zamindar
 Princely state

References

History of Punjab, India
History of Haryana